Catephia abrostolica is a species of moth of the  family Erebidae. It is found in Kenya, Tanzania and Uganda.

References

Catephia
Moths described in 1926
Moths of Africa